ZM-241,385 is a high affinity antagonist ligand selective for the adenosine A2A receptor.

In animal models, ZM-241,385 has been shown to protect against beta amyloid neurotoxicity and therefore may be useful as a treatment for Alzheimer's disease. ZM-241,385 has also been shown to enhance L-DOPA derived dopamine release and therefore may be useful in the treatment of Parkinson's disease.

References

External links

Phenols
2-Furyl compounds
Adenosine receptor antagonists